Stegall Branch is a  long 1st order tributary to Richardson Creek in Union County, North Carolina.  This is the only stream of this name in the United States.

Course
Stegall Branch rises in a pond about 1 mile east of New Salem, North Carolina and then flows southeast to join Richardson Creek about 2 miles southeast of New Salem.

Watershed
Stegall Branch drains  of area, receives about 48.0 in/year of precipitation, has a wetness index of 386.52, and is about 42% forested.

References

Rivers of North Carolina
Rivers of Union County, North Carolina